Har Har Gange is a 1979 Bollywood film directed by Babubhai Mistri. It stars Neera, Ashish Kumar, Anjana Mumtaz in the lead roles. The music is composed by Ravindra Jain and the lyrics are penned by Bharat Vyas. It is a color remake of the 1968 black and white movie sharing the same title and the story. The movie is an adaptation of Skanda Purana.

Plot
Distraught after the death of his wife Sati(incarnation of Adishaki), Shiva isolates himself and becomes immersed in deep meditation. To restore order, Adishakti takes birth as Ganga and Uma. Uma undertakes arduous austerities to break Shiva's penance to beget the prophesied child to slay Taraka, while Ganga is brought to heaven where she becomes a celestial river coursing the heavens, purifying anything she touches.

Cast
Neera ...  Ganga 
Ashish Kumar (actor) ...  Bhagwan Shiv 
Anjana Mumtaz ...  Sati / Parvati 
Vikram Gokhale ...  Bhagirath 
Jayshree Gadkar ...  Bhagirath's wife 
Jeevan ...  Narad Muni 
Mohan Choti...  Himalaya Raj 
Uma Dhawan...  Menaka 
Sudarshan Dhir ...  Kamdev 
Padma Khanna ...  Rambha 
Raj Kumar ...  Indra 
Sujata ...  Dancing decoy 
Jayshree T. ...  Rati 
B.M. Vyas ...  Paap

Soundtrack 

The music was composed by Ravindra Jain and lyrics, for all songs, written by Bharat Vyas.

"Amrut Sa Tera Paani" (version 1)  - Mahendra Kapoor
"Amrut Sa Tera Paani" (version 2)  - Mahendra Kapoor
"Mai Janm Janm Se Karu Tapasya" (part 1) - Asha Bhosle
"Pyasi Dharti Tujhe Pukare" - Manna Dey
"Navdurga Navroop Maiyya" - Hemlata
"Tum Ho Madhu Pyase Bhanware" - Asha Bhosle
"Main Janam Janam Se Karu Tapasya" (part 2)  - Asha Bhosle
"Main Rambha Roop Ki Raani" - Asha Bhosle, Hemlata

References

External links
 

1979 films
1970s Hindi-language films
Hindu mythological films
Films directed by Babubhai Mistry
Films scored by Ravindra Jain